Grammatorcynus is a genus of ray-finned bony fish in the family Scombridae.  This genus together with Acanthocybium and Scomberomorus are comprised by  the tribe Scomberomorini, commonly known as the Spanish mackerels or seerfishes.

Grammatorcynus comprises two species:
 Grammatorcynus bicarinatus (Quoy & Gaimard, 1825), shark mackerel
 Grammatorcynus bilineatus (Rüppell, 1836), double-lined mackerel

See also
 List of prehistoric bony fish

References

External links

 
Scombridae
Marine fish genera
Taxa named by Theodore Gill